Hush Hush Baby is a 2004 Dutch comedy film, written and directed by Albert ter Heerdt.

Plot
Hush, Hush Baby is about a Moroccan family that tries to find their way in Dutch society.

Abdullah 'Ap' Bentarek is a young Moroccan man, about 20 years old. He is happy that, unlike his Uncle Yusuf who stayed in the ancestral Moroccan mountain village, his own father, Ali, moved to the Netherlands. His mother knows only one sentence in Dutch, which she utters every time, and in a strong Moroccan accent: "Is goed" ("It's OK"). His father doesn't speak or understand Dutch at all.

He has, however, a tough choice to make. Either he can choose a modern Dutch lifestyle, playing some pool with his lousy friends and lead a life like his sister Leila does--Leila refuses to be married off and takes off her hijab often when attending school--or he can do what his father wants him to do: 'become serious', find a job and choose a bride in Morocco.

His older brother Sam is a policeman and is very well integrated in Dutch society. He gets Ap an officejob, at a bank he and his friends have dreamt of robbing, but Ap lasts only a day there. He then chooses to join his friends in the attempt to break into the bank. The attempt, however, fails miserably.

Meanwhile, his little brother Driss blackmails their sister Leila and other Muslim girls at his school, by taking pictures of them when they have taken off their hijab in school. His grades are low, but his parents don't know of that. When his father has to come over to discuss his grades, Driss accompanies him as his interpreter. Everything the teacher tells about his grades and his behaviour is not translated by him: instead, he tells his father his teacher thinks he is a brilliant student. The scheme fails when the conversation is overheard by a Moroccan cleaner who intervenes.

When Ap is heading for trouble, he decides to follow his fathers' advice and become 'serious'. He sets off for Morocco to find a bride, but if that is the right choice for him is uncertain.

Reception
The movie became one of the most successful Dutch comedy productions ever. Reactions from the Moroccan community were mixed: on one side, Moroccan youths claimed the movie, comparing themselves to the main characters; on the other side, the movie was criticised for being stereotypical and giving an overall negative impression of Moroccan immigrant families.

Cast

Mimoun Oaïssa as Ap
Salah Eddine Benmoussa as Ali
Zohra 'Flifla' Slimani as Khadija
Najib Amhali as Sam
Iliass Ojja as Driss
Tanja Jess as Maja
Frank Lammers as Chris
Touriya Haoud as Leila
Mimoun Ouled Radi as Rachid
Mohammed Chaara as Mussi
Leo Alkemade as Robbie
Winston Gerschtanowitz as Daan
Tara Elders as Britt
Bridget Maasland as Carlie

Production 

Since January 2006, Dutch broadcasting organisation VARA broadcasts Shouf Shouf! de serie.  In this series, most of the main cast is the same as in the film.  The series is directed by Tim Oliehoek.

References 

 
 
 

2004 films
2000s Dutch-language films
Films set in the Netherlands
2004 comedy films
Dutch comedy films